Imafen (R25540) is an antidepressant which was patented in the mid 1970s by Janssen, but was never marketed.

References 

Antidepressants
Imidazoles